Sripati Chandrasekhar (22 November 1918, Rajahmundry - 14 June 2001 San Diego, California) was a well-known Indian demographer, economist, sociologist, and scholar who has published extensively on demographics, especially related to India.

Chandrasekhar attended Vorhees High School in Vellore India which was a Protestant Christian school. Later he attended Madras Presidency College, from where he graduated with a B.A. and M.A. in economics. In 1944 he earned a Ph.D. in Sociology from New York University.

Sripati married Ann Downes, an American Quaker from New Jersey in a wedding officiated by protestant unitarian John Haynes Holmes in 1947. In April 1964, Chandrasekhar was elected to the upper house of the Indian parliament. He was appointed Minister of Health and Family Planning by Prime Minister Indira Gandhi in 1967.

Chandresekhar was deeply concerned by the growing Indian population and advocated a variety of population control measures such as sterilization, abortion, and abstinence. He faced criticism from traditional sectors of society, for example when he advocated that Indians begin eating beef, in contravention of Hindu tradition. He also traveled through communist China studying its population and social and economic trends.

References

1918 births
2001 deaths
Indian demographers
Rajya Sabha members from Tamil Nadu
20th-century Indian mathematicians
New York University alumni
Indian expatriates in the United States